Yanauma (Aymara yana black, dirty, stained, uma water, "black (or dirty) water", or Quechua yana black, uma face, "black face") is a  mountain in the Apolobamba mountain range in the Andes of Peru. It is situated in the Puno Region, Putina Province, on the border of the districts of Ananea and Sina. Yanauma lies northwest of the Riti Urmasca, north of Choquechambi, east of Chapi and southeast of Ritipata.

References

Mountains of Peru
Mountains of Puno Region